Cymbalaria pallida is a purple-flowered plant native only to mountainous parts of Italy. It belongs to the plantain family (Plantaginaceae).

Description
These plants bloom from June to August.

Distribution
This species is endemic to Italy.

Bibliography
Angiosperm Phylogeny Group, An update of the Angiosperm Phylogeny Group classification for the orders and families of flowering plants: APG III, in Botanical Journal of the Linnean Society 161(2 ): 105–121, 2009, DOI:10.1111/j.1095-8339.2009.00996.x

References

External links 

Plantaginaceae